Jim Chapman Lake (also known as Cooper Lake) is a  impoundment operated by the Army Corps of Engineers and is located  east of the Dallas/Fort Worth Metroplex in the state of Texas.

The reservoir was created by the 1991 Jim Chapman Dam and impounds the South Sulphur River, a fork of the Sulphur River. It provides water supply storage for the North Texas Municipal Water District, the Sulphur River Municipal Water District. The lake is known as a preferred location for fishing in the region. Species likely to be caught are blue and channel catfish, Florida largemouth bass, crappie, and hybrid striped bass.  The Texas Parks and Wildlife Department’s Cooper Lake State Park is located on Jim Chapman Lake.

The lake was formerly known as Cooper Lake, but was renamed by an act of Congress in 1998 to honor Jim Chapman, a former congressman from nearby Sulphur Springs. Cooper Lake State Park retains the earlier name.

References 

Protected areas of Delta County, Texas
Protected areas of Hopkins County, Texas
Reservoirs in Texas
Bodies of water of Delta County, Texas
Bodies of water of Hopkins County, Texas